The Cost of Living is the fifth album by Jason Webley, released in 2007.

Track listing
"Still" - 3:33
"Ways to Love" - 5:02
"Almost Time to Go" - 3:37
"They Just Want" - 3:44
"Disappear" - 3:43
"Raise Them Higher" - 3:46
"Meet Your Bride" - 3:41
"Clear" - 3:14
"Little Sister" - 2:37 (uses a variation on music from the song "Kykyrý" by Jana Vébrová)
"Back to You Again" - 4:30
"There's Not a Step We Can Take That Does Not Bring Us Closer" - 4:16

Personnel
Jason Webley - vocals, guitar, accordion, piano, marimba, glockenspiel
Jherek Bischoff - bass, guitarron, percussion, electric guitar, trombone
L. Alex Guy - viola, violin
Michael McQuilken - drums, percussion

References

 Jason Webley - The Cost of Living

Jason Webley albums
2007 albums